The Cathedral of Aveiro, also known as the Church of St. Dominic is a Roman Catholic cathedral in Aveiro, Portugal. It is the seat of the Diocese of Aveiro and built in Portuguese Baroque. It was founded in 1423 as a Dominican convent. Since 6 March 1996, it is on the register of National monuments of Portugal.

References

Aveiro
National monuments in Aveiro District
Buildings and structures in Aveiro, Portugal
Churches in Aveiro District